Uluk is a village in Jalal-Abad Region of Kyrgyzstan. It is part of the Aksy District. Its population was 1,503 in 2021.

Nearby towns and villages include Xazratishox (Uzbekistan, 4 km), Kerben (10 km), Bospiek (14 km), Munduz (9 km) and Sary-Kashka (5 km).

References
 

Populated places in Jalal-Abad Region